Charltona ariadna is a moth in the family Crambidae. It was described by Stanisław Błeszyński in 1970. It is found in Antananarivo, Madagascar.

The forewings of this species are 16–20 mm. Its ground colour is brownish with a light basal striped diffusing in the middle of the wing.

See also
List of moths of Madagascar

References

Crambinae
Moths described in 1970
Taxa named by Stanisław Błeszyński